Lotus Symphony can refer to:
 IBM Lotus Symphony, an office suite for Windows, Mac and Linux
 Lotus Symphony (DOS), an office suite for DOS from the 1980s